Mushtaq Ahmed Minhas(Born 12 August 1970) is a Pakistani politician who is former minister of Information, Tourism and Culture in the AJK assembly. He is a member of the 8th Legislative Assembly of AJK.

Career

Education
Mushtaq Minhas studied at Forman Christian College, in Lahore, from where he gained a Bachelor of Arts degree. He was also the vice president of the students' union islami jamiat talba. Mushtaq Minhas received Master of Arts degree in Mass Communication from University of Punjab, Lahore.

Journalism
Minhas was a member of the federal executive council of PFUJ (Pakistan Federal Union of Journalist) and a founder of the National Press Club Islamabad. He is also a former president of the Rawalpindi-Islamabad Press Club. However, he was named by a PFUJ investigation committee of swallowing a copy of the PFUJ elections result and causing mayhem.

He has worked with different leading news organisations as a reporter, senior reporter and chief reporter. He was elected as a secretary of Rawalpindi-Islamabad press club for six terms.

Minhas was co-host, along with Nusrat Javed, of Bolta Pakistan, a current affairs political talk show, on AAJ TV. He left the program to join BOL TV, but left shortly afterwards to join politics.

Political career

Minhas joined the Pakistan Muslim League (N) in March 2016, after which he announced his intention to quit journalism. He was elected Member of the National Assembly from the Bagh LA-14 constituency defeating Sardar Qamer Zaman Khan of PPP. 
He was appointed as Minister of Information, Tourism and Culture.

Controversy
His act of posing with a shotgun on Twitter while reacting to the Indian Army Chief created a controversy, particularly since he was a serving minister. His act of swallowing the election results during elections to the journalism body was criticised by an investigation committee of Pakistan Federation of Unions of Journalists (PFUJ), which accused him of causing mayhem.

References

External links
Bolta Pakistan archives

Pakistani television journalists
Living people
Forman Christian College alumni
University of the Punjab alumni
Azad Kashmir MLAs 2016–2021
BOL Network people
1968 births